Havneby is the main town on the Danish island of Rømø with a population of 252 (1 January 2022). A ferry connects Havneby to List on the island of Sylt in Germany.

References

Cities and towns in the Region of Southern Denmark
Rømø
Tønder Municipality